Mrenoga is a village in the municipality of Demir Hisar, North Macedonia. It used to be part of the former municipality of Sopotnica.

Demographics
According to the 2002 census, the village had a total of 107 inhabitants. Ethnic groups in the village include:

Macedonians 105
Other 2

References

Villages in Demir Hisar Municipality